Ngomburr, also spelt Ngumbur, is a supposed extinct Australian Aboriginal language. It has sometimes been assumed to be a dialect of Umbugarla, but it is not attested; the only evidence to go on is that neighbouring peoples reported that it was similar to Umbugarla. It was spoken to the west of the South Alligator River, between the Ga'baarlgu and the South Alligator River, in Kakadu, Northern Territory.

There were two speakers recorded in 1975, but none since then, on the AUSTLANG database.

References

Unattested languages of Australia
Extinct languages of the Northern Territory
Darwin Region languages
Arnhem Land